Rhagovelia pacifica is a species of aquatic bug first found in Vereda San José del Guayabo, Consejo Comunitario Río Mejicano, Tumaco, Nariño, Colombia.

References

Veliidae
Arthropods of Colombia
Insects described in 2011